Yusuke Miyata (宮田 悠佑, Miyata Yūsuke, born 21 May 1991) is a Japanese canoeist. He competed in the men's K-4 500 metres event at the 2020 Summer Olympics.

References

External links
 

1991 births
Living people
Japanese male canoeists
Olympic canoeists of Japan
Canoeists at the 2020 Summer Olympics
Place of birth missing (living people)